Ferenc Tóth (February 8, 1909 – February 26, 1981) was a Hungarian featherweight wrestler. He won a bronze medal at the 1948 Olympics in Greco-Roman wrestling, and placed 4th–5th in freestyle wrestling in 1936 and 1948. Between 1934 and 1947 Tóth won seven medals at European championships.

References

1909 births
1981 deaths
Olympic wrestlers of Hungary
Wrestlers at the 1936 Summer Olympics
Wrestlers at the 1948 Summer Olympics
Hungarian male sport wrestlers
Olympic medalists in wrestling
Medalists at the 1948 Summer Olympics
Olympic bronze medalists for Hungary
Sportspeople from Szeged
20th-century Hungarian people